Savchenkov (feminine Savchenkova) is an East Slavic family name. It may refer to:

Alexander Savchenkov, Russian ice hockey player
Anton Sergeyevich Savchenkov, Russian football player
Sergei Savchenkov,  Russian professional football coach and a former player

East Slavic-language surnames